Eric Paul Willmot , (31 January 1936 – 20 April 2019) was an Australian Aboriginal scholar, educator and engineer.

Education
Willmot was educated first at various Queensland schools and then obtained his BSc and DipED at the University of Newcastle (Australia). Willmot eventually obtained his Master of Education (Research) in 1980 at the University of Canberra.

Career
After obtaining his Master of Education, Willmot joined the faculty of the Australian National University. He was the first indigenous principal of the Australian Institute of Aboriginal Studies from 1981-1984 (later known as the Australian Institute of Aboriginal and Torres Strait Islander Studies, AIATSIS). Willmot later joined the James Cook University as Professor of Education. Willmot retired from public administration in 1994 to then do engineering research in private enterprise.

In 1986, Willmot gave the annual series of Australian Broadcasting Corporation Boyer Lectures on "Australia The Last Experiment". In the same year, he gave the inaugural Frank Archibald Memorial Lecture on "Future Pathways: Equity or Isolation".

Other esteemed positions held by Willmot included Director of Research at the ANU, Deputy Secretary of the Department of Aboriginal Affairs, and Chief Education Officer in the ACT Department of Education.

Personal
Willmot was born on 31 January 1936 in Queensland. 
He had 4 kids between 1950 and 1970. He later re-married and had a 5th child.
He died at Baulkham Hills, New South Wales on 20 April 2019.

Honours and awards
 1981 Australian Inventor of the Year
 1984 Member of the Order of Australia for service to education and in the field of aboriginal studies.

References

1936 births
2019 deaths
University of Canberra alumni
University of Newcastle (Australia) alumni
Academic staff of the Australian National University
Academic staff of James Cook University
Members of the Order of Australia